Ghara'ib al-Qur'an wa Ragha'ib al-Furqan or, named in brief, Ghara'ib al-Qur'an, better known as Tafsir al-Nisaburi, is a classical   (exegesis) of the Qur'an, authored by the Shafi'i-Ash'ari scholar Nizam al-Din al-Nisaburi (died ; , who closely follows al-Fakhr al-Razi's  in many places.

It was the first commentary of the Qur'an in Arabic written in India. A handwritten copy of this commentary is available in the Library of the tomb of Hadrat Peer Muhammad Shah Sahib in Ahmedabad.

This commentary took him about five years to finish.

Background 

Nizam al-Din al-Nisaburi relied on several earlier sources for his interpretation, including the following:
 Mafatih al-Ghayb by Fakhr al-Din al-Razi, died . 
 Al-Kashshaf by al-Zamakhshari, died  (1144CE).
 Al-Wasīt fi Tafsir al-Qur'ān al-Majīd by al-Wahidi al-Nisaburi, died  (1075–1076CE).

Reception 

About the author 

He was a Persian mathematician, astronomer, Faqīh (jurist), Qur'an exegete, poet, and was generally regarded as a sage, that is, one attuned to philosophy and logic. He was born in Nisapur and was known as Nizam al-A'raj. The origin of his family and his clan is the city of Qom. After completing his education he came to India, settling there, most likely in Daulatabad. He wrote several books on philosophy, geography and sufism. The exact year of his death is not known, but it was after .

See also 
 Tafsir al-Razi
 Tafsir al-Baydawi
 Tafsir al-Tabari
 Tafsir Ibn Ajiba
 List of tafsir works
 List of Sunni books

References

Further reading

External links 
 Tafsir al-Nisaburi - Altafsir.com 
 The Comprehensive Elucidation of the Interpretation of the Qurʼan - World Digital Library

Nisaburi
Sufi literature
Quranic exegesis
Nisaburi